Petrić is a South Slavic surname, a patronymic of Petar. Notable people with the name include:

 Bojan Petrić, Bosnian football player
 Branka Petrić, Serbian actress
 Denis Petrić, Serbian football player
 Frane Petrić, Croatian philosopher
 Gordan Petrić, Serbian football player
 Ivo Petrić, Slovenian composer
 Maja Petrić, Croatian artist
 Mladen Petrić, Croatian football player
 Nemanja Petrić, Serbian volleyball player
 Nevenka Petrić, Serbian writer
 Nikola Petrić, Serbian football player
 Ratko Petrić, Croatian sculptor
 Tonka Tomičić Petrić, Chilean model of Croatian descent
 Tonka Petrić, Croatian painter
 Vladimir Petrić, Serbian handball player

Croatian surnames
Serbian surnames
Surnames from given names